Neuilly is a common place name in France. 

By far the best-known is Neuilly-sur-Seine, a wealthy suburb immediately west of Paris.

Other large communes with this name are Neuilly-sur-Marne and Neuilly-Plaisance, to the east of Paris.

The full list includes:

See also

 Neuilly–Porte Maillot (Paris RER), rapid transit station in Neuilly-sur-Seine
 Pont de Neuilly (Paris Métro), rapid transit station in Neuilly-sur-Seine
 Pont de Neuilly, bridge in Neuilly-sur-Seine

References